Jeżów  is a small town in Brzeziny County, Łódź Voivodeship, in central Poland. It is the seat of the gmina (administrative district) called Gmina Jeżów.

The village has a population of 1,400.

References

Villages in Brzeziny County